Henry Ricardo Barrientos Pinto (born 20 April 1966) is a Chilean football manager and former footballer who played as a defensive midfielder and centre-back

Playing career
Next, he played for Chiprodal de Graneros (1983) and Católico 21 de Mayo (1987–89) in the Chilean Cuarta División and for Cultural Doñihue (1984),  (1985–86) and Juventud O'Higgins (1986) in the Chilean Tercera División.

In 1990, he emigrated to Central America thanks to his uncle Wilfredo Barrientos. He first arrived to Honduras and next moved to Nicaragua to join Dragón. After he played for Verdes FC in Belize, Real Estelí, UNAN Managua and Águilas de León in the Nicaraguan top division. As a member of Real Estelí, he won the league title in 1991.

Coaching career
With an extensive career as coach in Guatemala, he began his career performing as both player and coach of Nicaraguan club Águilas de León in 1993. After rejecting an offer to play for Deportivo San Marcos, he assumed as coach of Guatemalan club Deportivo Usumatlán in the Segunda División in the same year.

In 1997, he also led a league team from the Segunda División de Ascenso in an inter-league championship.

He is well known as El Señor de los Ascensos (The Lord of the Promotions) due to the fact that he has got promotions with Deportivo Sanarate (1997–98, 2014–15), Peñarol La Mesilla (2008), Sololá (2017) and Quiché FC (2018).

In 2019 he coached Barillas FC.

In 2020 and 2021–22 he coached Jacalteco FC.

In June 2022, he signed with Aguacatán FC.

Personal life
He is the nephew of the former professional footballers Wilfredo Barrientos and Sergio "The Doctor" Fuenzalida, who played for O'Higgins. In addition, his father served as director for the same club.

He performed as a football commentator in the TV program Dueños del balón (Ball Owners) from Antigua Sports channel.

Honours

As player
Real Estelí
 Liga Primera de Nicaragua: 1991

As manager
Deportivo Sanarate
 Segunda División de Ascenso: 1997–98

Sololá
 Segunda División de Ascenso: Apertura 2016

References

External links
 Henry Barrientos at PlaymakerStats.com
 

1963 births
Living people
Chilean footballers
Chilean expatriate footballers
O'Higgins F.C. footballers
Verdes FC players
Real Estelí F.C. players
Chilean Primera División players
Tercera División de Chile players
Salvadoran Primera División players
Nicaraguan Primera División players
Chilean expatriate sportspeople in El Salvador
Chilean expatriate sportspeople in Belize
Chilean expatriate sportspeople in Nicaragua
Expatriate footballers in El Salvador
Expatriate footballers in Belize
Expatriate footballers in Nicaragua
Association football midfielders
Association football defenders
Chilean football managers
Chilean expatriate football managers
Chilean expatriate sportspeople in Guatemala
Expatriate football managers in Nicaragua
Expatriate football managers in Guatemala
Chilean association football commentators